MH is the debut solo album by American R&B recording artist Marques Houston. Conceived after the disbandment of his former boy band Immature, the album was first released by Interscope and Elektra Records on October 21, 2003 in the United States. MH features guest appearances by Joe Budden, Jermaine Dupri, former B2K member Lil' Fizz and peaked at number 18 on the US Billboard 200, and peaked at number 5 on Billboards Top R&B/Hip-Hop Albums.

 Critical reception

AllMusic editor Andy Kellman found that "Houston doesn't have much in the way of originality to offer, but he and his collaborators have put together a respectable album that should retain his original fan base while adding some new admirers. The fact that Houston co-produced and wrote a handful of the songs — some of which are among the album's best — bodes well for a future that he's been keeping in mind ever since the Immature days."

 Track listing Notes'
 denotes co-producer

Charts

Release history

References

2003 debut albums
Marques Houston albums
Interscope Records albums
Elektra Records albums
Albums produced by Jermaine Dupri
Albums produced by R. Kelly
Albums produced by Troy Taylor (record producer)